Tree of Knowledge is a 1981 Danish coming-of-age drama directed by Nils Malmros. The film details the lives of 17 teenage schoolmates in 1950s Denmark. Shooting on location at the high school which he had attended, Malmros took two years to film the action, so the cast members reflected the real-life physical and emotional development of their characters.

Despite critical praise, Tree of Knowledge received only two awards: the Danish Film Critics Bodil Award for Jan Weincke's cinematography, and the Audience Award at the Lübeck Nordic Film Festival. Tree of Knowledge is one of the top 100 Danish films listed by the Danish Film Institute and is one of ten films listed in the cultural canon of Denmark by the Danish Ministry of Culture.

The film was screened in the Un Certain Regard section at the 1982 Cannes Film Festival and was selected as the Danish entry for the Best Foreign Language Film at the 55th Academy Awards, but was not accepted as a nominee.

Cast

Production
When Nils Malmros called Gitte Iben Andersen and told her that she had become the chosen one to play Lene, she noticed that there was also a nudity scene. She was therefore refusing, but nevertheless said yes, when the film director added in a slight way that all other girls had said yes, without knowing that he had used the same trick towards the other girls.

Reception 
Film Critic Roger Ebert of the Chicago Sun-Times wrote "The Tree of Knowledge is the truest and most moving film I have ever seen about the experience of puberty... a creative act of memory about exactly what it was like to be 13 in 1953."

See also 
 List of submissions to the 55th Academy Awards for Best Foreign Language Film
 List of Danish submissions for the Academy Award for Best Foreign Language Film

References

External links 
 IMDb
 Kundskabens træ, at Den Danske Film Database (In Danish)
 

1981 films
Danish Culture Canon
Danish coming-of-age drama films
1950s Danish-language films
Films directed by Nils Malmros
1980s coming-of-age drama films
Films about puberty
Juvenile sexuality in films
Films set in the 1950s

Films set in Denmark